David Day (born October 1947) is a Canadian author and poet. He is best known for his books on J. R. R. Tolkien. Day has published 46 books that have sold over 3 million copies.

Early life and education 
Day was born and raised in Victoria on Vancouver Island, Canada. His father worked as chief fireman for area military bases. Day was editor of his high school's newspaper, and also contributed high school sports columns to the Victoria Daily Times, graduating from Victoria High School in 1966.

After finishing high school, Day worked as a logger for five years on Vancouver Island before graduating in 1976 from the University of Victoria.

Career 

Day has published over 46 books of poetry, natural history, ecology, mythology, fantasy and children's literature. Day has been a columnist for Punch. He is best known for his books on the life and works of J. R. R. Tolkien.

In 2015, Day received a Distinguished Alumni Award from the University of Victoria.

Works on Tolkien
Day has written at least 15 books pertaining to the world created by J. R. R. Tolkien. His first book, A Tolkien Bestiary, released in 1979, is an illustrated reference book on the fauna, flora and people of Middle-earth. The book has been translated in 20 languages and reprinted numerous times since. The Dutch version reached the best-seller list.

The Tolkien family's publishers, HarperCollins, commissioned Day to write The Hobbit Companion, but dropped the book when Christopher Tolkien objected and threatened a lawsuit. Day was forced into bankruptcy by the protracted legal battle. He later found another publisher for the book, and the rewritten version was approved by the Tolkien estate.

With the release of The Lord of the Rings: The Rings of Power series, Day's 2019 An Encyclopedia of Tolkien debuted on the Toronto Stars list of bestselling books in Canada on October 12, 2022.

Other books 
Day's first book of poetry, The Cowichan, was based on a journal he kept during his logging years. He collaborated with Japanese artist Warabe Aska on three children's books, writing poems to accompany Aska's illustrations.

Day explored his theory that Alice's Adventures in Wonderland was written in mathematical code in his book, Alice's Adventures in Wonderland: Decoded, based on 18 years of research studying more than 1,000 different editions of Carroll's book.

Critical reactions
Time magazine and The Observer named Day's The Doomsday Book of Animals the critics' book of the year in 1981.

Colin Tudge, writing in New Scientist reviewed The Doomsday Book of Animals, writing:

A review in Quill & Quire wrote of Nevermore:

Publications
 The Cowichan. Oolichan Books, 1975
 Many Voices. North Vancouver, 1977
 The Burroughs Bestiary. UK: New English Library, 1978
 A Tolkien Bestiary. London: Chancellor Press, 1979
 The Scarlet Coat Serial. Canada: Press Porcepic, 1981  
 The Doomsday Book of Animals. New York: Viking Press, 1981
 The Animals Within. Canada: Penumbra Press, 1984 
 Castles. New York: Bantam Books, 1984
 Gothic. Canada: Exile Editions, 1986
 The Emperors Panda. Canada: McClelland & Stewart, 1986
 The Whale War. UK: Rutledge, 1987
 The Emperor's Panda. London: Piccadilly, 1988
 The Eco Wars. London: Harrap, 1989	
 The Swan Children. London: Piccadilly Press, 1989
 The Encyclopedia of Vanished Species. UK: Universal Books, 1989
 Noah’s Choice. London: Viking Penguin, 1990
 True Tales of Environmental Madness. London: Pelham Books, 1990
 The Sleeper. London: Piccadilly Press, 1990
 Tolkien: The Illustrated Encyclopedia. London: Mitchell Beazley, 1991
 The Walking Catfish. New York: Macmillan, 1991
 Aska’s Animals. Canada: DoubleDay, 1991
 Aska’s Birds. Canada: DoubleDay, 1992	
 A-Z of Tolkien.  London: Mandarin, 1993
 Tippu. London: Piccadilly Press, 1993	
 King of the Woods. London: Anderson Press, 1993
 Aska’s Sea Creatures. Canada: DoubleDay, 1994	
 The Complete Rhinoceros. London: EIA Books, 1994
 Tolkien’s Ring. London: Harper Collins, 1994
 The Quest for King Arthur. London: De Agostini, 1996
 The Visions and Revelations of St Louis De Metis. Canada: ThistleDown Press, 1997	
 Just Say No To Family Values	and Other Rants, Howls, and Moans. Toronto: Exile Editions, 1997
 The Hobbit Companion. London: Pavillion Books, 1997
 The World of Tolkien: Mythological Sources of Lord of the Rings. London: Mitchell Beazley, 	2003
 Nevermore: A Book of Hours. Toronto: Quattro Books, 2012
 A Dictionary of Tolkien. London: Cassell, 2013
 Alice's Adventures in Wonderland: Decoded. Toronto: Doubleday, 2015	
 An Atlas of Tolkien. London: Cassell, 2015
 The Battles of Tolkien. London: Cassell, 2016
 The Heroes of Tolkien. London: Cassell, 2017
 The Dark Powers of Tolkien. London: Cassell, 2018
 The Hobbits of Tolkien. London: Cassell, 2019
 The Illustrated World of Tolkien. San Diego: Thunder Bay Press, 2019	
 The Ring Legends of Tolkien. London: Cassell, 2020
 An Encyclopedia of Tolkien: The history and mythology that inspired Tolkien’s world. San Diego: Canterbury Classics, 2019

Personal life 
Day has a daughter and is married to Róisín Magill. As of 2020, he lives in Toronto.

References

External links 
 Official website
 
 

1947 births
Living people
People from the Capital Regional District
Writers from British Columbia
Canadian biographers
Canadian male poets
Male biographers
Tolkien studies
20th-century biographers
20th-century Canadian poets
21st-century Canadian non-fiction writers
20th-century Canadian male writers
21st-century Canadian male writers
Canadian children's writers
Canadian literary critics
University of Victoria alumni